The Perth Scorchers are an Australian cricket club who play in the Women's Big Bash League, the national women's domestic Twenty20 competition. The club was established in 2015 as an inaugural member of the eight-club league. This list includes players who have played at least one match for the Scorchers in the Women's Big Bash League.

Records

List of Players

 

Source: ESPN.cricinfo Scorchers Batting records and ESPN.cricinfo Scorchers Bowling & Fielding records

See also
 List of Perth Scorchers cricketers

References 

Perth Scorchers (WBBL) cricketers

Perth, Western Australia-related lists